Goes tumifrons is a species of beetle in the family Cerambycidae. It was described by Linsley and Chemsak in 1984. It is known from the United States.

References

Lamiini
Beetles described in 1984